Andrew Firth (born 26 September 1996) is an English professional footballer who plays as a goalkeeper for Cymru Premier club Connah's Quay Nomads.

Early and personal life
Firth was born in Ripon, North Yorkshire.

Career
Firth began his career with Cockermouth. He joined Liverpool at under-11 level. He spent time on loan at Witton Albion in 2015, and moved on loan to Chester in January 2018, and made 11 appearances for the club before returning to Liverpool in May. Firth had obtained his coaching badges whilst with the Liverpool Academy, and due to financial constraints at Chester he acted on occasion as coach for loanee Will Jääskeläinen.

After leaving Liverpool in the summer of 2018, he signed for Barrow in July. He moved to Scottish club Rangers in January 2019, after 18 league appearances for Barrow. He made his senior debut for Rangers against Kilmarnock in May 2019.
Firth signed a new one-year deal with Rangers on 29 April 2021. On 12 February 2022, Firth joined Partick Thistle on loan in the Scottish Championship.

Firth left Rangers in June 2022 and joined Connah's Quay Nomads in July 2022.

Honours
Rangers
Scottish Premiership: 2020–21

References

1996 births
Living people
English footballers
Liverpool F.C. players
Witton Albion F.C. players
Chester F.C. players
Barrow A.F.C. players
Rangers F.C. players
Partick Thistle F.C. players
Scottish Professional Football League players
Association football goalkeepers
Chester F.C. non-playing staff
Connah's Quay Nomads F.C. players